Finse is a mountain village area on the shore of the lake Finsevatnet in Ulvik municipality in Vestland county, Norway. The village is centered on Finse Station, a railway station on the Bergen Line. The village lies in the eastern part of Ulvik municipality, and it is not easily accessible from the rest of the municipality. There is no road access, only a railway stop. The long Finse Tunnel lies just west of the village area, replacing a difficult section of rail that frequently was blocked by snow and difficult to clear. According to the BBC, the village was used for expedition training by Amundsen, Scott and Shackleton.

Transportation

Since there are no (public) roads to Finse, the railway provides the sole means of transportation to and from Finse. During summer, however, it is possible to walk or cycle to Finse on the Rallarvegen road (owned by the railroad). Across the railway line from the station is housed the railway navvy museum, which has exhibits on the construction of the railway line and two decommissioned snow-clearing engines which visitors are free to explore. The area also has a hotel (Finse 1222), a hostel (Finsehytta, DNT), and many private cabins.

Recreation
During the winter, Finse is popular for cross-country skiing, sail skiing (due to its location on the edge of the frozen lake Finsevatnet), expedition training, and Red Cross training. The ill-fated Scott expedition to the South Pole trained here, and outside the hotel there is a monument to those that died. There is one small drag-lift which allows downhill skiing on one slope back into town.

During the summer, the recreational focus switches to mountain cycling, walking, and glacier walking on the adjacent "blue ice" Hardangerjøkulen glacier. The Rallarvegen is a popular bicycle route, from Haugastøl to Flåm.

Research
Finse is home to the Alpine Research Center operated by the University of Oslo and University of Bergen. The Centre began  its work in 1972, initially under the title of the High Mountain Ecological Research Station. The Centre hosts numerous workshops, conferences, and research projects from both Norwegian and international institutions. It is part of EU-funded International Network for Terrestrial Research and Monitoring in the Arctic (INTERACT).

Climate
Finse has an alpine tundra climate (Et in the Köppen climate classification) due to the high altitude.
The wettest season is late summer and autumn, and the driest season is spring. 
The Finsevatn weather station, 1.5 kilometer from Finse Railway Station, started recording in 1993. The station also records snow depth. There is usually snow on the ground from late October or November to late May or June.

In culture
Finse is the setting for the climax to the 1948 Hammond Innes novel The Blue Ice.

In March 1979, Finse was the location chosen to portray the ice planet Hoth in The Empire Strikes Back, the sequel to the 1977 Star Wars film. Other areas in Finse were used to create the Hoth map in the 2015 video game Star Wars Battlefront.

The Finse Tunnel, the village, and the "Finse 1222" Hotel are the setting of Anne Holt's 2007 novel 1222.

References

External links

Finse 
Finse1222 Hotel
Kitebrothers.no
360 Panoramas from Finse
HD YouTube video of the Finse portion of the Bergen Line, an HD video of the rail journey from Bergen to Oslo, Norway produced by NRK (Norwegian National Broadcasting).
Finse Alpine Research Centre
University of Oslo
EU Interact

Ulvik
Villages in Vestland